Zahira College (commonly known as Zahira) is an Islamic school at Colombo in Maradana, Sri Lanka. It was founded in 1892 as Al Madrasathul Zahira by notable Islamic lawyer and educationalist, Muhammad Cassim Siddi Lebbe, with the active patronage of Ahmed Orabi Pasha of Egypt. The college also has one of the oldest mosques in the country on its campus.

The word Zahira means "excellence" in Arabic.


History

The idea of school mainly for Muslims was conceived by prominent individuals at the time, such as Proctor M. C. Siddi Lebbe, when circumstances were positively hostile to English education due to the reasons where English education was very much associated with proselytism. At this juncture in history of Sri Lanka almost all the schools in the country were run by Christian missionaries. Because Sri Lanka had not won its independence from the British Empire an almost state aided conversion submerged other communities. Nevertheless, Muslim pioneers in education were more than satisfied that Islam would weather assaults at conversion but that education was essential for the Muslim community's progress For its very survival. Thus, due to this and many other pertaining factors which was taken placed on those years later, Zahira College was established on Monday, 22 August 1892.

Factors influencing establishment

During a public speech made by M. C. Siddhi Lebbe in 1891 at the Maradana Mosque Hall (which later became the college mosque), he appealed to the Muslim community to unite and promote the educational advancement of the community. This led to the formation of the Colombo Muslim Educational Society. The first Secretary was I. L. M. Abdul Aziz and Arasi Marikar Wapchie Marikar was the first Treasurer and Head Master. With the help of Ahamed Orabi Pasha, an Egyptian exile in Ceylon and freedom fighter, Al-Madrasathul Zahira was established. In 1894 the school was registered as a grant-in-aid school Maradana Mohammedan Boys School.

Board of Governors 
Zahira College is administered by a board of eighteen governors, from the executive committee of the Maradana Mosque, the Zahira College Welfare Society, the Zahira College Parent-Teachers Association and the Zahira College Old Boys’ Association. M. Fouzul Hameed, who took over as chairman of the Board of Governors in 2006.

Sports 
Zahira college, Colombo had constructed major sports complex for the scholars who are interested in sports to represent College.

Soccer 
The college has produced a number of Soccer players who represented the Sri Lanka national team.

Swimming 
The college swimming pool project was proposed and funded by the Old Boys Association. and it was officially opened for students, old boys and the public (after school hours).  The project was initiated in 2010 and successfully completed and opened on 14 July 2012.

Cricket 
Zahira college has produced a number of international cricket players in 1930's and later days in 20th century zahirians had joint with Sri Lankan Cricket and they are improving them to be representatives at National team of Sri Lanka.

Athletic 
Many athletic players had bought a glory and fame to Zahira College by showcasing their talents.

Other 
Currently, there are number of sports like Air Rifle Shooting, Basketball, Hockey, Karate, Boxing, Band, Cadeting, Chess, Scouting, Tennis etc. to the scholars.

Houses
Students are divided into four houses. The houses compete in all major games to win the inter-house games, with house colours and awarded to winners.

 Angora colour : Green 
 Baghdad colour : Blue 
 Cordova colour : Orange 
 Istanbul colour : Maroon 

The four house names are derived from four historic Muslim cities.

 Angora of Turkey
 Baghdad of Iraq
 Cordova of Spain
 Istanbul of Turkey

Clubs and associations

Clubs and societies 
Today there are about thirteen clubs and societies in Zahira College.

Associations 
There are associations where Zahira old boys owned them with respect for helping purpose to the college and to give pride further to the alma mater.

Headmasters 
A. M. Wapchie Marikar
N. H. M. Abdul Cader
A. S. Abdul Cader
S. J. A. Doray
Abdul Azeez

Principals

Notable alumni
Zahira produced citizens who are fluent in all three national languages. During the "Golden Era of Zahira" many brilliant leaders were produced and they made enormous contribution to the nation and the world at large. Zahira's Magazine ‘Cresent’ towards the development of national languages was immense.

References

External links
Official website
The College Anthem

1892 establishments in Ceylon
Educational institutions established in 1892
Schools in Colombo